The domain name .tv is the Internet country code top-level domain (ccTLD) for Tuvalu.

Except for reserved names like com.tv, net.tv, org.tv and others, any person may register second-level domains under .tv. The domain name is popular, and thus economically valuable, because it is an abbreviation of the word television. In 1998, the Tuvalu government sought to capitalize on the .tv suffix being short for "television". In 2019, 8.4% of the revenue of the Government of Tuvalu came from .tv royalties.

Management of the top-level Internet domain suffix, .tv

Information.CA and Idealab
Following Tuvalu being allocated two-letter top-level Internet domain suffix, .tv, the Government of Tuvalu worked with the International Telecommunication Union and created a process to select a management partner for the domain suffix.

On 6 August 1998, a licensing agreement was signed with Information.CA of Toronto under which it agreed to pay an up-front payment of US$50 million for exclusive marketing rights to Tuvalu's domain until 2048, with the country manager/delegee of the Government of Tuvalu for the .tv extension being The .tv Corporation International, which was established in 1998. Subsequent negotiations with Information.CA followed from the delays in payment of US$50 million.

Idealab, a California company, became involved in 1999 and assumed the $50 million obligation to be paid over 10 years. With the first $1 million payment, Tuvalu was finally able to afford to join the United Nations. Lou Kerner became the first employee of .tv when he joined as CEO in January 2000. .tv grew to over 100 employees, with offices in Los Angeles, London, and Hong Kong, before being acquired in a nine-figure transaction in December 2001.

Verisign

The .tv Corporation entered into an agreement with VeriSign Inc for the marketing of the domain.
In December 2001, The .tv Corporation was sold to VeriSign in a nine-figure transaction.  As of 31 December 2001, The .tv Corporation International became a subsidiary of VeriSign Inc. Tuvalu sold its equity stake in The .tv Corporation to VeriSign for which it was paid US$10 million. Following the acquisition of the corporation by VeriSign the quarterly payments made to the Government of Tuvalu were reduced to US$550,000 per quarter, which payment arrangement continued for 12 years.

On 14 December 2006, Verisign announced an alliance with Demand Media, run by former MySpace chairman Richard Rosenblatt to market the .tv top level domain name (TLD) as the preferred Web address for rich media content. ".TV" premium names cannot be transferred to another registrar. Annual renewal fees for .TV premium names are the same as the initial "buy now" registration fee.

On 16 March 2010, Sedo announced that it had teamed up with Verisign to hold an exclusive auction on 1 April for 115 premium .TV domain names that would carry standard non-premium annual renewals regardless of the closing auction price. On 19 March, Verisign announced that premium .TV names would now be available through an expanded .TV registrar channel, slashed prices on premium .TV names, and made a significant number of high sought after premium .TV names non-premium. As a result, Verisign essentially lifted the roadblock that previously discouraged investment in the .TV extension by major domainers, investors, and developers.

In 2011, VeriSign renewed the contract with the Government of Tuvalu to manage the .TV registry through to 2021. In 2014, Amazon acquired Twitch for $1 billion, becoming the first .tv website to achieve unicorn status. Verisign pays Tuvalu around US$5 million per year for the right to administer .tv. Tuvalu earns about 1/12th of its annual gross national income (GNI) from the agreement with Verisign. The success of Twitch.tv and other esports and video game platforms means that Tuvalu can expect to derive increased revenue following 2020, when it either renegotiates the agreement with VeriSign or signs an agreement with another company engaged in domain name registration.

GoDaddy

On 14 December 2021, the Ministry of Justice, Communication and Foreign Affairs of the Tuvalu Government announced on Facebook that they have selected Godaddy Registry as the new registry service provider for the domain after Verisign did not participate in the renewal process.

Content stations

Websites with the .tv domain often feature video content for specific brands or firms. Publications like The Sydney Morning Herald and Pitchfork Media run sub-stations of their online publications strictly for original video content. Marketing firms like Vice in New York have received contracts to create brand-tailored .tv content stations, such as Motherboard.tv for Dell and the Creator's Project for Intel have given this domain type more visibility, and inspired the creation of independent content stations at the college level across the United States such as Massive.tv at Northwestern University, Maingreen.tv at Brown University, and Kuumba.tv at Washington University in St. Louis.

co.tv
"co.tv" is not an official hierarchy; it is a domain (co.tv) owned by a company who offers free subdomain redirection services, like co.nr.

This company offers free co.tv subdomains. In July 2011, Google removed .co.tv websites from its search results due to their extensive use by website scammers. This had no impact on other .tv websites.

According to Lucian Constantin at Softpedia, "CO.TV is a free domain provider that is obviously being abused by the people behind this campaign. All of the rogue domains used are hosted on the same IP address."

Future of .tv
The island state of Tuvalu's long-term habitability is threatened by climate change, with the island being barely above sea level. In response to the question of what would happen if a nation-state would cease to exist, the ICANN board stated: "If the code element is removed, the ccTLD is eligible for Retirement. Reason for removal is not of relevance." This means that the top-level domain is dissolved if the country would disappear.

References

 
 

Computer-related introductions in 1996
Communications in Tuvalu
Council of European National Top Level Domain Registries members
Country code top-level domains
Domain hacks

sv:Toppdomän#T